Manshiya Zabda, also known as Manshiyet Zabda, is a Muslim-majority Arab village in northern Israel. Located to the north of Ramat Yishai, it falls under the jurisdiction of Jezreel Valley Regional Council.

History
The village was established in 1945 by sons of families from Ilut. Over time the founders were joined by Bedouin (nomads) and fellahin (farmers) from the Galilee. The village was recognised by the authorities in 1979.

See also
Arab localities in Israel
Bedouin in Israel

References

Arab villages in Israel
Populated places established in 1945
Populated places in Northern District (Israel)
1945 establishments in Mandatory Palestine